The following is a list of Bulgarian actors.

Maria Bakalova
Nikolay Binev
Vasil Binev
Radina Borshosh
Ivaylo Brusovski
Adriana Budevska
Georgi Cherkelov
Stefan Danailov
Mariana Dimitrova
Tanya Dimitrova
Ivan Dimov
Nina Dobrev
Moshe Dvoretzky
Itzhak Fintzi
Stoyan Gadev
Vasil Gendov
Georgi Georgiev-Getz
Anton Gorchev
Kiril Gospodinov
Stanislav Ianevski
Viktor Kalev
Georgi Kaloyanchev
Apostol Karamitev
Hindo Kasimov
Lyudmil Kirkov
Asen Kisimov
Konstantin Kisimov
Nevena Kokanova
Todor Kolev
Victoria Koleva
Julian Kostov
Konstantin Kotsev
Zahari Baharov
Marius Kurkinski
Tatyana Lolova
Dimitar Manchev
Tzvetana Maneva
Ruslan Maynov
Moni Moshonov 
Stoyanka Mutafova
Anjela Nedyalkova
Lyubomir Neikov
Nikolay Nikolov
Dimitar Panov
Georgi Partsalev
Katya Paskaleva
Ideal Petrov
Georgi Popov
Dimitar Rachkov
Yana Marinova
Krasimir Radkov
Bashar Rahal
Đoko Rosić
Georgi Rusev
Hristo Shopov
Petar Slabakov
Evstati Stratev
Nikola Todev
Grigor Vachkov
Ivaylo Zahariev
Stefan Valdobrev
Rangel Vulchanov
Yuriy Yakovlev

See also
 List of actors
 List of Bulgarians
 List of Bulgarian musicians and singers

Bulgarian actors
Bulgarian actors
Actors